NFL Fever was an American football video game series published and developed by Microsoft Game Studios. In February 2005, Microsoft sold the series to Ubisoft.

Installments

Discontinuation
Following Microsoft's release of their 2004 professional sports titles, all of them were discontinued, including NBA Inside Drive and NHL Rivals.

References

NFL Fever video games
Ubisoft franchises